Elsinoë is a genus of fungi. Many of the species in this genus are plant pathogens.

 
Myriangiales